= China women's national inline hockey team =

China women's national inline hockey team is the national team for China. The team competed in the 2013 Women's World Inline Hockey Championships.
